Matthias Plachta (born 16 May 1991) is a German professional ice hockey forward who is currently playing for Adler Mannheim of the Deutsche Eishockey Liga (DEL). He is the son of Jacek Płachta, a former player and coach of the Poland men's national ice hockey team.

Playing career
Plachta played for Schwenningen and Mannheim as a junior and made his debut in Germany's second division for Heilbronn during the 2008–09 season. The following season, he logged first minutes in Germany's top-flight Deutsche Eishockey Liga (DEL) with Adler Mannheim. After six seasons in the DEL, including winning the title with Mannheim in 2015, and having secured a role in the German national team, Plachta was signed to a one-year entry-level contract with the Arizona Coyotes of the National Hockey League (NHL) on 28 May 2015.

In his debut North American season in 2015–16, Plachta was assigned to Arizona's AHL affiliate, the Springfield Falcons. In 46 games with the Falcons, Plachta compiled two goals and 7 points before the Coyotes traded him on trade deadline day along with a conditional 7th-round draft pick in 2017 to the Pittsburgh Penguins in exchange for Sergei Plotnikov on 29 February 2016. Plachta played a total of 30 contests for Pittsburgh's AHL affiliate Wilkes-Barre Scranton Penguins during the season.

Having not been given the opportunity to play in the NHL during the season, and with Pittsburgh opting not to extend a qualifying offer, Plachta returned to Germany, returning to Adler Mannheim on 30 June 2016 with the signing of a four-year deal.

International play
He represented Germany at the 2018 IIHF World Championship.

Career statistics

Regular season and playoffs

International

Awards and honours

References

External links
 

1991 births
Living people
Adler Mannheim players
German ice hockey forwards
German people of Polish descent
Heilbronner Falken players
Ice hockey players at the 2018 Winter Olympics
Medalists at the 2018 Winter Olympics
Olympic ice hockey players of Germany
Olympic medalists in ice hockey
Olympic silver medalists for Germany
Sportspeople from Freiburg im Breisgau
Springfield Falcons players
Wilkes-Barre/Scranton Penguins players
German expatriate ice hockey people
German expatriate sportspeople in the United States
Ice hockey players at the 2022 Winter Olympics